The 2016–17 Howard Bison men's basketball team represented Howard University during the 2016–17 NCAA Division I men's basketball season. The Bison, led by seventh-year head coach Kevin Nickelberry, played their home games at Burr Gymnasium in Washington, D.C. as members of the Mid-Eastern Athletic Conference.  They finished the season 10–24, 5–11 in MEAC play to finish in a tie for 11th place. They defeated Coppin State and Morgan State in the MEAC tournament before losing in the semifinals to Norfolk State.

Previous season
The Bison finished the 2015–16 season 12–20, 6–10 in MEAC play to finish in a tie for fifth place. They lost in the first round of the MEAC tournament to North Carolina Central.

Preseason 
The Bison were picked to finish in first place in the preseason MEAC poll. James Daniel III and Marcel Boyd were named to the preseason All-MEAC first team and Damon Collins was named to the third team. Daniel was also named the conference preseason player of the year.

Roster

Schedule and results

|-
!colspan=9 style=| Regular season

|-
!colspan=9 style=| MEAC tournament

References

Howard Bison men's basketball seasons
Howard Bison
Howard
Howard